Goksan No clan was one of the Korean clans. Their Bon-gwan was in Koksan County, Hwanghae Province. According to the research in 1985, the number of Goksan No clan was 7453. He was the 9th son of  who was dispatched to Silla when he was a Hanlin Academy in Tang dynasty. No Jo, a 's descendant, began Goksan No clan and made Koksan their Bon-gwan.

See also 
 Korean clan names of foreign origin

References

External links 
 

 
Korean clan names of Chinese origin